In R&D management and systems development, open coopetition  or open-coopetition is a neologism to describe cooperation among competitors in the open-source arena. The term was first coined by the scholars Jose Teixeira and Tingting Lin to describe how rival firms that, while competing with similar products in the same markets, cooperate which each other in the development of open-source projects (e.g., Apple, Samsung, Google, Nokia) in the co-development of Webkit).

Open-coopetition is a compound-word term bridging coopetition and open-source. Coopetition refers to a paradoxical relationship between two or more actors simultaneously involved in cooperative and competitive interactions; and open-source both as a development method that emphasizes transparency and collaboration, and as a "private-collective" innovation model  with features both from the private investment and collective action — firms contribute towards the creation of public goods while giving up associated intellectual property rights such patents, copyright, licenses, or trade secrets.

By exploring coopetition in the particular context of open-source, Open-coopetition  emphasizes transparency on the co-development of technological artifacts that become available to the public under an open-source license—allowing anyone to freely obtain, study, modify and redistribute them. Within open-coopetition, development transparency and sense of community are maximized; while the managerial control and IP enforcement are minimized. Open-coopetitive relationships are paradoxical as the core managerial concepts of property, contract and price play an outlier role.

The openness characteristic of open-source projects also distinguishes open-coopetition from other forms of cooperative arrangements by its inclusiveness: Everybody can contribute.  Users or other contributors do not need to hold a supplier contract or sign a legal intellectual property arrangement to contribute. Moreover, neither to be a member of a particular firm or affiliated with a particular joint venture or consortia to be able to contribute. In the words of Massimo Banzi, "You don't need anyone's permission to make something great".

More recently open-coopetition is used to  describe open-innovation among competitors more broadly with many cases out of the software industry. While some authors use open-coopetition to emphasize the production of open-source software among competitors, others use open-coopetition to emphasis open-innovation among competitors.

History

2008

In a large-scale study involving multiple European-based software intensive firms, the scholars Pär Ågerfalk and Brian Fitzgerald revealed a shift from "open-source  as a community of individual developers to open-source as a community of commercial organizations, primarily small and medium-sized enterprises, operating as a symbiotic ecosystem in a spirit of coopetition".
Even if they were exploring open-sourcing as "a novel and unconventional approach to global sourcing and coopetition", they captured the following quote that highlights that competition in the open-source arena is not as in business as usual. 
 "In a traditional market you don't call up your competitor and be like, oh, well tell me what your stuff
 does. But in open source you do." [Open Source Program Director, at IONA]

2012

Also in the academic world, and after following a software company based in Norway for over five years, and while theorizing on the concept of software ecosystem, the academic Geir K. Hanssen noted that the characteristic networks of a software ecosystem, open-source or proprietary ones, can embed competing organizations.

"Software ecosystems have a networked character. CSoft and its external environment constitute a network of customers and
third party organizations. Even competitors may be considered a part of this network, although this aspect has not been studied
in particular here."

In an opinion article entitled Open Source Coopetition Fueled by Linux Foundation Growth, the journalist and market analyst Jay Lyman highlights that "working with direct rivals may have been unthinkable 10 years ago, but  Linux, open-source and organizations such as the Linux Foundation  have highlighted how solving common problems and easing customer pain and friction in using and choosing different technologies can truly drive innovation and traction in the market." The term "open source coopetition" was employed to highlight the role of the Linux Foundation as a mediator of collaboration among rival firms.

2013
At the OpenStack summit in Hong Kong, the co-founder of Mirantis  Boris Renski talked about his job on figuring out how to co-opete in the crowded OpenStack open-source community. In a 43-minute broadcast video, Boris Renski shed some light on OpenStack coopetition politics and shared a subjective view on strategies of individual players within the OpenStack community (e.g., Rackspace, Mirantis, IBM, HP and Red Hat among others). The Mirantis co-founder provided a rich description of an open-source community working in co-opetition.
 

Along with this lines, the pioneering scholarly work of Germonprez et al. (2013) reported on how key business actors within the financial services industry that traditionally viewed open-source software with skepticism,  tied up an open-source ‘community of competitors’.  By taking the case of  OpenMAMA, a Middleware    Agnostic Messaging   API used by some of the world's largest financial players,  they show that corporate market rivals (e.g., J. P. Morgan, Bank of America, IBM and BMC) can coexist in open-source communities,   and intentionally coordinate activities or mutual benefits in precise, market focused,     and non-differentiating engagements.  Their work pointed out that high-competitive capital-oriented industries do not epitomize the traditional and grassroots idea that open-source software was originally born from. Furthermore, they argued that open-source communities can be deliberately designed to include competing vendors and customers under neutral institutional structures (e.g., foundations and steering committees).

2014 
In an academic paper entitled "Collaboration in the open-source arena: The WebKit case", the scholars Jose Teixeira and Tingting Lin executed an ethnographic informed social network analysis on the development of the WebKit open-source web browsing technologies. Among a set of the reported findings, they pointed out that even if Apple and Samsung were involved in expensive patent wars in the courts at the time, they still collaborated in the open-source arena. As some of the research results did not confirm prior research in coopetition, the authors proposed and coined the "open-coopetition" term while emphasizing the openness of collaborating with competitors in the open-source arena.

2015 

By turning to OpenStack, the scholars Teixeira et al. (2015)
went further and modeled and analyzed both collaborative and competitive networks from the OpenStack open-source project (a large and complex cloud computing infrastructure for big data).  Somewhat surprising results point out that competition for the same revenue model (i.e., operating conflicting business models) does not necessarily affect collaboration within the OpenStack ecosystem—in other words, competition among firms did not significantly influence collaboration among software developers affiliated with them. Furthermore, the expected social tendency of developers to work with developers from same firm (i.e., homophily) did not hold within the OpenStack ecosystem. The case of OpenStack revealed to be much about genuine collaboration in software development besides ubiquitous competition among the firms that produce and use the software.

2016 

A related study by Linåker et al. (2016) analyzed the Apache Hadoop ecosystem in a quantitative longitudinal case study to investigate changing stakeholder influence and collaboration patterns. They found that the collaborative network had a quite stable number of network components (i.e., number of sub-communities within the community) with many unconnected stakeholders. Furthermore, such components were dominated by a core set of stakeholders that engaged in most of the collaborative relationships. As in OpenStack, there was much cooperation among competing and non-competing actors within the Apache Hadoop ecosystem—or in other words, firms with competing business models collaborate as openly as non-rivaling firms. Finally, they also 
argued that the openness of software ecosystems decreases the distance to competitors within the same ecosystem, it becomes possible and important to track what the competitors do within. Knowing about their existing collaborations, contributions, and interests in specific features offer valuable information about the competitors’ strategies and tactics.

In a study addressing coopetition in the cloud computing industry, Teixeira et al. analyzed not only coopetition among individuals and organizations but also among cohesive inter-organizational networks. Relationships among individuals were modeled and visualized in 2D longitudinal visualizations and relationships among inter-organizational networks (e.g., alliances, consortium or ecosystem) were modeled and visualized in 3D longitudinal visualizations. The author added evidence to prior research suggesting that competition is a multi-level phenomenon that is influenced by individual-level, organizational-level, and network-level factors.

By noting that many firms engaging into open-coopetition actively manage multiple portfolios of alliances in the software industry (i.e., many strategically contribute to multiple open-source software ecosystems) and by analyzing the co-evolution of OpenStack and the CloudStack cloud computing platforms,  the same authors propose that development transparency and the weak intellectual property rights, two well-known characteristics of open-source ecosystems, allow an easier transfer of information and resources from one alliance to another.  Even if openness enables a focal firm to transfer information and resources more easily between multiple alliances, such  'ease of transfer'  should not be seen as a source of competitive advantage as competitors can do the same.

2017 

In a study explicitly addressing coopetition in open-source software ecosystems, Nguyen Duc et al. (2017) identified a number of situations in which different actors within the software ecosystem deal with collaborative-competitive issues:

 Central actors that act as a bridge between the community and the companies contributing to it (e.g., a lead developer or a maintainer) need to act as gatekeepers (aka boundary spanners) for bugs reported against specific products sold by the participating firms. As the software is integrated downstream into specific products often sold by competing firms, it matters to sort out what bugs are the responsibility of a specific firm or the community as a whole. In parallel, such 'bridging' actors also act as gatekeepers in flows of code and information  (e.g., what code should, or should not, be included in the official community-releases and what information should circulate among the ecosystem participants).
 Contributors affiliated with firms need to balance the interests of their employers with the interests of the community as a whole. Therefore, their work encompasses the filtering of what is to be kept private (hidden and/or property of the firm)  or what is to be open (transparent and publicly available under the open-source community terms). Such filtering is impacted by many factors that can range from technical, legal, bureaucratic, as well as organizational strategy issues.  .

Competitive behavior within open-source software ecosystems frictions with the more purist view of free and open-source software. The same authors reported on some working practices that conflict with the more traditional values of free and open-source software.
 
 Developers occasionally establish private communication channels. Some open-source purists would prefer that all communication remains transparent and publicly available to the overall community.
 Developers limit sensitive information to certain partners.  While purists would prefer all relevant information to remain available to all ecosystem participants, legal or security issues are often discussed in private and secure communication channels.

The same study also unfolded a number of benefits that organization can rip by actively contributing to open-source software ecosystems that encompass both cooperative and competitive relationships: 
 Keeping the differences between their packaged software and the upstream software to a minimum. This allows firms to more easily benefit from the newest developments in the community. By implementing an upstream first policy,  organizations can more easily catch updates, fixes, and changes from upstream. 
 Sharing maintenance responsibilities. Organizations working only downstream (i.e., just taking the software without contributing back) become solely responsible for maintaining their solution without the benefit of the overall community. 
 Reducing maintenance costs by revealing their own developments. If organizations extensively modify the software and opt to close some parts (keep it private or obfuscated) they will need to maintain such closed parts by themselves in the future without the benefit of the overall community.  
 Faster integration of new contributions. Active contributors will get their work integrated upstream more easily due to an improved social position within the community.
 Receiving help.  Active contributors with an improved social position within the community are more likely to benefit from the help from others members in the community.  Given the complex nature of software development, help from other members in the ecosystem can be very valuable.
 A sense of friendly competitiveness.  Besides being competitors, the ecosystem participants develop a sense of community. Developers employed by competing firms can perceive others as partners and/or friends rather than competitors.  In their work, developers often think of others as developers, partners or colleagues (individual persons) over the firms that they are representing.
 Mutual co-creation of value. Even if many of competing firms are competitors they are often also customers/suppliers of each other. Furthermore, they might be competing in different geographical areas or different business domains creating a heterogeneous and heterophilous environment for reciprocal learning and value co-creation. Given the complex nature of software development, value creation should benefit from the involvement of multiple and heterogeneous actors holding complementary skills and resources.

2018 
 
In the last chapter of book dedicated to coopetition strategies, scholars Frédéric Le Roy  and Henry Chesbrough developed the concept of open-coopetition by combining insights from both the open innovation and coopetition literatures.
They departed from open-coopetition in the specific realm of open-source software to the more broader context of open innovation among competitors.  Their work defines open-coopetition as "open innovation between competitors including collaboration", outline key success factors of open innovation based on collaboration with a competitors, and calls for further research on the topic.

2019 

  
While proposing a research agenda for open-coopetion, Roth et al.  (2019)
argued that there is no need to narrow the concept of open coopetition to the software industry. More broadly, they redefined the concept as "simultaneously collaborative and competitive open innovation between competitors and third parties such as networks, platforms, communities or ecosystems". Furthermore, they also argued that open-coopetition not only takes place in a growing number of industries but also constitutes both a management challenge at the individual or inter-firm level and as an organizing principle of many regional or national innovation systems. While prior work explored open-coopetition among individuals, firms, platforms and ecosystems, Roth et al.  (2019) discussed open-coopetition among Public–private partnerships and the Triple helix model of innovation that relies on the  interactions refers to a set of interactions between academia (the university), industry and government.

At the   6th World Open Innovation Conference 2019, 

Seran and Bez (2019) also 
referred open-coopetition to "a distributed innovation process based on purposively managed knowledge flows between competitors".
As in the work of Roy  and Chesbrough  (2018) they emphasize the innovation dimension of open-coopetition  out of the context of open-source software.

2020 

An editorial review of a special issue on "coopetition strategies" pointed out the popularity of the open-coopetition strategy among firms. The scholars pinpointed  that  from a strategic management perspective  "it seems very important to know why, how and for which outcomes they follow this kind of strategy".

Cases 

Cases of open-coopetition are recurrent in the software industry in general. Furthermore, some cases exist also in the electronics, semiconductors, automotive, financial, telecommunications, retail, education, healthcare, defense, aerospace, and additive manufacturing industries. Cases of open-coopetition are often associated with high-tech corporations and startups based in the USA (predominantly on the West Coast). Cases can be also recognized in Cuba, Brazil,  Europe (predominantly on Western Europe),  India, South-Korea,  China, Vietnam, Australia, and Japan.

Many of the software projects encompassing open-coopetition are legally governed by foundations such as the Linux Foundation, the Free Software Foundation, the Apache Software Foundation, the Eclipse Foundation, the Cloud Native Computing Foundation, and the X.Org Foundation among many others.  Most of the Linux Foundation collaborative projects are coopetitive in nature --- the Linux Foundation claims to be "a neutral home for collaborative development". Furthermore, many coopetitive open-source projects dealing with both software and hardware (e.g., computer graphics, data storage) are bounded by standard organizations such as the Khronos Group, W3C and the Open Compute Project.

Software-intensive domains

Beyond software

See also 
 Co-Opetition: A Revolution Mindset That Combines Competition and Cooperation

References

External links
 Research project website addressing open-coopetition in the WebKit open-source project 
 Research project website addressing open-coopetition in the OpenStack open-source project

Strategic alliances
Research and development
Business terms
Public commons
Strategic management
Business models
Systems engineering
Free software
Criticism of intellectual property